Raj Narain Passi is an Indian politician. He was elected to the Lok Sabha, lower house of the Parliament of India from Bansgaon , Uttar Pradesh as a member of the Bharatiya Janata Party.

References

External links
 Official biographical sketch in Parliament of India website

India MPs 1991–1996
India MPs 1998–1999
India MPs 1999–2004
1949 births
Lok Sabha members from Uttar Pradesh
Bharatiya Janata Party politicians from Uttar Pradesh
Living people
People from Gorakhpur district